The 1975 Temple Owls football team represented Temple University in the 1975 NCAA Division I-A football season. In the first game of the season, Temple nearly upset sixth-ranked Penn State, but lost 26–25.

Schedule

Roster

References

Temple
Temple Owls football seasons
Temple Owls football